The All Nepal Teachers Association is a trade union of teachers in Nepal. The union is linked to the Unified Communist Party of Nepal (Maoist). Guna Raj Lohani is the chairman of the union.

References

Trade unions in Nepal
Education-related professional associations